Vladimir Ivanovich Valutsky (25 September 1936 — 14 April 2015) was a Soviet and Russian screenwriter. Honored Art Worker of the RSFSR (1987). Between 1964 and 2013 he wrote and co-wrote 60 screenplays.

Early years
Vladimir was born in Moscow, Russian SFSR into a mixed Russian-Polish family. His father Ivan Ivanovich (Yanovich) Valutsky moved from Poland to Moscow at the beginning of the World War I along with his own mother Maria Ivanovna Valutskaya and his brother Stefan. He studied engineering and built aerodromes during the Great Patriotic War, then worked in Gosplan and various ministries. Vladimir's mother Galina Vasilyevna Valutskaya (née Kolcheva) was a housewife. Her parents — Vasily Alekseyevich Kolchev and Iulitta Ivanovna Rakhmanova, both from working-class families — arrived to Moscow from the Ryazan Governorate and the Tula Governorate respectively.

Valutsky started practicing screenwriting during his school days as he and his friends were watching many trophy films captured during the war. In 1956 he entered VGIK to study screenwriting under Valentin Turkin. During the studies he met Alla Demidova, also a student at the Boris Shchukin Theatre Institute, and married her in 1961. Same year he and several other students were expelled from the institute following a grand scandal: it was revealed they had written a parody on a revolutionary drama play that featured Vladimir Lenin. Vladimir later managed to enroll back to VGIK and eventually finished it in 1964 (Yevgeny Gabrilovich's course).

Career
In-between he co-wrote a play Fallen and Alive for the newly-found Taganka Theatre where his wife served as a leading actress, although his novel was banned from the play by censorship. After graduating he got acquainted with Vitaly Melnikov, also a young director who was searching for a screenwriter for his feature comedy debut. The Head of Chukotka was produced in 1966 and released to a mild success (15.7 million viewers), yet it gave a great push to the career of the popular comedy actor Mikhail Kononov. It also started a long-lasting collaboration between Valutsky and Melnikov. In four years they made another comedy film — Seven Brides of Yefreytor Zbruev that turned into one of the box office leaders of 1971 (11th place with 31.2 million viewers). They produced the total of four movies between 1966 and 1987.

Valutsky also regularly worked with Igor Maslennikov. Between 1969 and 2009 they made seven movies together, including the second entry in the popular Soviet TV series The Adventures of Sherlock Holmes and Dr. Watson and Winter Cherry, a popular drama of the late 1980s (4th place with 32.1 million viewers) that won several awards at the 1986 All-Union Film Festival and was continued in two sequels. On March, 2016 Maslennikov revealed his plans to produce the fourth part based on his own screenplay.

Valutsky was among those few Soviet screenwriters who successfully continued their career after the dissolution of the Soviet Union. His most famous work of this time period was a biographical war drama Admiral (2008) about the fate of Alexander Kolchak. With a $38 135 878 gross it is among the highest-grossing films of the post-Soviet Russia. A longer version of the movie was made into a 10-part TV mini-series and showed by the Channel One Russia in 2009. Valutskiy also wrote a screenplay for another biographical mini-series Yesenin (2005) about one of the greatest Russian poets of the 20th century Sergei Yesenin. It was based on the book by the Russian actor Vitali Bezrukov; his son Sergey Bezrukov played the main part.

Valutsky himself played small parts in two movies: Concerto for Two Violins (1975) and Charlotte's Necklace (1984). Between 1990 and 1995 Valutsky also taught screenwriting courses at VGIK. During his late years he wrote a children's book Romuald the Tasmanian about the adventures of an Australian wombat. Despite living together for 54 years, he and his wife Alla Demidova left no children.

Vladimir Valutsky died on April 14, 2015 after a long illness. He was buried at the Troyekurovskoye Cemetery.

Selected filmography

Notes

External links

Main Role. Vladimir Valutsky talk show by Russia-K (in Russian)

1936 births
2015 deaths
Mass media people from Moscow
Russian people of Polish descent
20th-century Russian screenwriters
Male screenwriters
20th-century Russian male writers
Soviet screenwriters
Gerasimov Institute of Cinematography alumni
Academic staff of the Gerasimov Institute of Cinematography
Burials in Troyekurovskoye Cemetery